King Zhuangxiang of Qin (281– 6 July 247 BCE), personal names Yiren and Zichu, was a ruler of the Qin state during the third century BCE in the Warring States period of ancient China.<ref name="RGH">‘‘Records of the Grand Historian: Qin Dynasty (English translation). (1996). Ssu-Ma, Ch'ien. Sima, Qian. Burton Watson as translator. Edition: 3, reissue, revised. Columbia. University Press. , 9780231081696. pg 35. pg 59.</ref>

Life
Yiren was born to Lord Anguo, the second son and heir apparent of King Zhaoxiang, and Lord Anguo's concubine Lady Xia. He was chosen to serve as a political hostage in the Kingdom of Zhao. In Handan (the capital of Zhao) he met a merchant, Lü Buwei, who saw Yiren as extraordinary and detected in him the potential to become the king of Qin in the future. Lü Buwei treated Yiren well and presented his concubine Lady Zhao to Yiren. Lady Zhao later bore Yiren a son, Ying Zheng.

In the meantime, through bribes and machinations, Lü Buwei helped Yiren return to Qin. He also successfully conditioned Lord Anguo's primary spouse, the childless Lady Huayang, to adopt Yiren as her own son, thereby making Yiren become Lord Anguo's legitimate heir apparent. As Lady Huayang was a native of the Chu state, she renamed Yiren to "Zichu" ( "son of Chu"). Upon the death of King Zhaoxiang in 251 BCE, Lord Anguo ascended the throne and became historically known as "King Xiaowen", but he died in the following year just three days after the date of his coronation. Zichu succeeded his father as the king of Qin and became historically known as "King Zhuangxiang of Qin". He named Lü Buwei as his chancellor, Lady Zhao as his queen consort, and Ying Zheng as his crown prince.

Zhuangxiang died in 247 BCE after reigning for three years and was succeeded by Ying Zheng. Ying Zheng unified China and founded the Qin dynasty in 221 BCE, becoming historically known as "Qin Shi Huang" (First Emperor of Qin).

He was posthumously declared as Taishang Huangdi by Ying Zheng.

Popular culture

He is portrayed by Mao Zijun in the Chinese television series The Legend of Haolan'' (2019).

Ancestry

References 

281 BC births
247 BC deaths
3rd-century BC Chinese monarchs
Rulers of Qin
Chinese kings
Qin Shi Huang